D Album is the fourth studio album of the Japanese group KinKi Kids. It was released on December 13, 2000. Debuting at the top of the Oricon charts, the album sold 354,830 copies in its first week.

Track listing

References

 D Album. Johnny's net. Retrieved October 31, 2009.

External links
 Official KinKi Kids website

2000 albums
KinKi Kids albums